Dalmacio Vélez Sarsfield is a locality located in the Tercero Arriba Department in the Province of Córdoba in central Argentina.

References

Populated places in Córdoba Province, Argentina